Satyrium mackwoodi, the Mackwood's hairstreak, is a small butterfly found in India that belongs to the lycaenids or blues family.

See also
List of butterflies of India
List of butterflies of India (Lycaenidae)

References
 
  
 
 
 
 

mackwoodi
Butterflies of Asia
Endemic fauna of India
Taxa named by William Harry Evans